Georges Laloup (24 May 1903 – 13 March 1979) was a Belgian racing cyclist. He rode in the Tour de France between 1929 and 1931.

References

External links
 

1903 births
1979 deaths
Belgian male cyclists
People from Amay
Cyclists from Liège Province